Ainsi soient-ils, also known as The Churchmen and Thy Will Be Done in English-speaking countries, is a French television series. In The U.S., the series was shown on MHz Networks.

Content
The series takes place in the fictional seminary of the Capucins in Paris. In the foreground are five seminarians who come from different backgrounds: Yann comes from Brittany and is a scout. Raphael comes from a rich Catholic family. Emmanuel - adoptive son of African descent - is an archaeologist and has turned down the opportunity to graduate to attend the seminar. He was under treatment for depression. Guillaume studied political science and lived in a homosexual partnership. José has killed a Russian drug dealer in a dispute, he has served his prison sentence. Together, the goal is to become a priest. The series accompanies them through the studies and the process of detachment from their previous lifes. In the process, inner and outer conflicts of the protagonists are described. The hand of the Capucin Seminary Father Fromenger accompanies the five young men. For more than 20 years he is director of the seminary. He is assisted by Father Bosco. In the second season, the seminary is facing its closure.

Remake
As of 2017, Tom Fontana was said to be involved in an American remake of the series, set in New York City and set to be aired on Netflix.

Cast
 Jean-Luc Bideau: Étienne Fromenger
 Thierry Gimenez: Dominique Bosco
 Michel Duchaussoy: Joseph Roman
 Julien Bouanich: Yann Le Megueur
 David Baiot: Emmanuel Charrier
 Clément Manuel: Guillaume Morvan
 Clément Roussier: Raphaël Chanseaulme
 Samuel Jouy: José Del Sarte
 Sabine Pakora: Fatou

References 

2012 French television series debuts
French drama television series
Television shows set in France